Pemphredon rugifer  is a species of solitary wasp in the family Crabronidae. It is found in Europe, northern Asia, and Africa.

References

External links
Images of Pemphredon rugifer at BOLD

Crabronidae
Hymenoptera of Europe
Insects described in 1844